Strahan Arena is a 10,000-seat multi-purpose arena in San Marcos, Texas. It is an $8.8 million facility built in 1982 and is home to the Texas State University Bobcats men's basketball team, women's basketball team and women's volleyball team. 

The arena was previously known as Strahan Coliseum, but changed its name to the University Events Center as part of a late 2018 expansion.

On September 15, 2008, the Houston Comets and the Sacramento Monarchs of the WNBA came to play in the Coliseum due to Hurricane Ike canceling the final home game of the regular season for the Houston Comets. The Comets defeated Sacramento 90–81. This would end up being the last game the Comets ever played; they folded after the season ended.

On March 21-22, 2021, the arena hosted six First Round games of the 2021 NCAA Division I women's basketball tournament as part of the relocation of the entire event to San Antonio and surrounding areas due to COVID-19 precautions.

See also
 List of NCAA Division I basketball arenas

References

External links
Strahan Coliseum
Strahan Coliseum - Texas State University

College basketball venues in the United States
Sports venues in Texas
Basketball venues in Texas
Indoor arenas in Texas
Buildings and structures in San Marcos, Texas
Houston Comets venues
Texas State Bobcats basketball
Volleyball venues in Texas